Ganesapura may refer to:

 Ganeshpur, Bhandara, Maharashtra, India
 Ganeshpur, Punjab, India
 Ganeshpur, Chanditala-I, Hooghly district, West Bengal, India
 Ganeshpur Bharta, a "twin village" of which this is part
 Ganesapuram, a hamlet in the village of Vilpatti, Tamil Nadu, India
 Ganeshpur, Syangja, Gandaki, Nepal
 Ganeshpur, Kapilvastu, Lumbini, Nepal
 Ganeshpur, Dadeldhura, Mahakali, Nepal
Ganeshpur, Pachperwa, Uttar Pradesh

See also
 Ganeshpuri (disambiguation)